In cricket, a five-wicket haul (also known as a "five-for" or "fifer") refers to a bowler taking five or more wickets in a single innings. This is regarded as a significant achievement. As of 2022, 162 cricketers have taken a five-wicket haul on their debut in a Test match, with 49 of them being England players. Alfred Shaw was the first Englishman to take a five wicket haul at Test debut. He took five wickets for 38 runs in the first Test in history, against Australia at the Melbourne Cricket Ground in March 1877, but could not prevent England's defeat. Two Australian bowlers also picked up fifers in the same match. The most recent Englishman to achieve the feat was Rehan Ahmed. He took five wickets for 48 runs against Pakistan at Karachi in December 2022. Dominic Cork's seven wickets for 43 runs against West Indies in the second Test of the 1995 series are the best bowling figures for an Englishman on debut.

Key

Five-wicket hauls

Notes

References

England

Test